In the 1938 FIFA World Cup qualification Group 2, the two teams played against each other on a home-and-away basis. The winner Norway qualified for the third FIFA World Cup held in France.

Matches

Norway vs Ireland

NOTE: Rolf Holmberg missed a penalty (Alf Martinsen was fouled) at the end of the first half.

Ireland vs Norway

Norway qualified.

Team stats

Head coach:  Asbjørn Halvorsen

Head coach:  Joe Wickham

External links
FIFA official page
RSSSF - 1938 World Cup Qualification
Allworldcup

2
1937 in Norwegian football
1937–38 in Irish association football
qual